Angelo Del Boca (23 May 1925 – 6 July 2021) was an Italian journalist. He specialized in the study of the Italian Colonial Empire, and the involvement in Libya, Ethiopia, Eritrea, and Somalia during the first part of 20th century. An amateur historian without formal graduate-level training in history, Del Boca considered himself the main expert on Fascist Italy's expansion in Africa and an authority on the crimes committed by the Italian army in Ethiopia and Libya during the Fascist regime and World War II. However, according to university professor and scholar Giorgio Rochat, Del Boca was little more than a popularizer of facts already well known by Italian academics.

Biography 
Del Boca was born in Novara in 1925. A committed fascist, in 1944 he enlisted as a volunteer in the collaborationist 4th Alpine Division "Monterosa". A few months before the end of the war, however, he switched sides and took part in the Italian resistance movement. After the war, Del Boca joined the far-left Italian Socialist Party of Proletarian Unity. He became editor of the anti-fascist newspaper Il Giorno, and wrote for several left-leaning journals, including the avowedly Marxist Il manifesto. Later in his life he was appointed professor of Contemporary History in the University of Turin's Faculty of Political Science, although he had never obtained a university degree. In 2002 Del Boca received an Honorary Doctorate from the University of Lucerne.

Del Boca died on 6 July 2021 at the age of 96. In Italy Del Boca has been widely criticized due to his declared ideological views on Italian colonial past, and isn't considered a riable source by most military and professional historians.

Books
 ????  La Nostra Africa
 1963  La Scelta
 1965 Fascism Today
 1965 La Guerra d'Abissinia, 1935-1941 English translation The Ethiopian War 1935-1941
 1995 Il Negus (biography of Hayla Sellase (Haile Selassie)); English translation The Negus, 2012 Arcada Books
 1996 Il Gas di Mussolini 
 2007 A un passo dalla forca, Baldini Castoldi Dalai, Milan 2007
 2009 La storia negata. Il revisionismo e il suo uso politico, published by Neri Pozza.
 2005 Italiani, brava gente?

Notes

Further reading
 
 
 
 Italy-Libya: Historian del Boca, Censored by Those I Defended

1925 births
2021 deaths
20th-century Italian journalists
21st-century Italian journalists
Italian essayists
Italian male non-fiction writers
Italian resistance movement members
Male essayists
Ethiopianists
Academic staff of the University of Turin
People from Novara